Highland station or Highlands station may refer to:

Highland station (Capital MetroRail), a commuter rail station in Austin, Texas, USA
Highland station (MBTA), a commuter rail station  in Boston, Massachusetts, USA
Highland station (New York), a former rapid transit station in Rochester, New York, USA
Highland station (PAAC), a light rail station in Bethel Park, Pennsylvania, USA
Highland station (SEPTA), a commuter rail station in Philadelphia, Pennsylvania, USA
Highland Avenue station (SEPTA), a commuter rail station in Philadelphia, Pennsylvania, USA
Highland Village/Lewisville Lake station, a commuter rail station in Highland Village, Texas, USA
Highlands station, a commuter rail station in Hinsdale, Illinois, USA
Fujikyu-Highland Station, a railway station in Fujikawaguchiko, Yamanashi, Japan
Hollywood/Highland station, a subway station in Los Angeles County, California, USA

See also
Highland (disambiguation)
Highland Park station (disambiguation)